Flavio Roberto Carraro (3 February 1932 – 17 June 2022) was an Italian Roman Catholic prelate.

Carraro was born in Italy and was ordained to the priesthood in 1957. He served as bishop of the Roman Catholic Diocese of Arezzo-Cortona-Sansepolcro, Italy, from 1996 to 1998 and as bishop of the Roman Catholic Diocese of Verona, Italy from 1998 until his retirement in 2007.

References

External links

1932 births
2022 deaths
Italian Roman Catholic bishops
Franciscan bishops
Bishops appointed by Pope John Paul II
Bishops of Verona